Mika Mármol Medina (born 1 July 2001) is a Spanish professional footballer who plays for FC Andorra. Mainly a central defender, he can also play as a left-back.

Club career

Barcelona
Born in Terrassa, Barcelona, Catalonia, Mármol started his career with FC Barcelona in 2006. He left two years later andcontinue his development in the academies of UFB Jàbac Terrassa and CF Damm, before returning to Barcelona in June 2018. He made his senior debut with the reserves on 12 October 2019, coming on as a late substitute for Óscar Mingueza in a 3–0 Segunda División B home win over Orihuela CF.

On 1 July 2020, Mármol renewed his contract with Barça and was definitely promoted to the B-team. He became a regular starter for the side, and scored his first senior goal on 17 January 2021, in a 3–1 away loss against Gimnàstic de Tarragona.

Mármol made his first team – and La Liga – debut for Barcelona on 15 May 2022, replacing fellow youth graduate Alejandro Balde late into a 0–0 away draw with Getafe CF.

Andorra
On 30 August 2022, Mármol signed a two-year contract with Segunda División newcomers FC Andorra.

Career statistics

Club

Notes

References

External links

2001 births
Living people
Footballers from Terrassa
Spanish footballers
Spain youth international footballers
Association football defenders
Segunda División B players
Primera Federación players
La Liga players
CF Damm players
FC Barcelona Atlètic players
FC Barcelona players
FC Andorra players
Spanish expatriate footballers
Spanish expatriate sportspeople in Andorra
Expatriate footballers in Andorra